Icefloe Lake is located in Grand Teton National Park, in the U. S. state of Wyoming. Due to a being situated at high altitude, Icefloe Lake is only free of ice in late summer.

References

Lakes of Grand Teton National Park